Amorpha  may refer to:
 Amorpha, a plant genus in the family Fabaceae
 Amorpha (moth), a moth genus in the family Sphingidae